The following is a list of episodes of the TLC television series Kitchen Boss, a daily cooking show hosted by Buddy Valastro. 

Kitchen Boss premiered on January 25, 2011.

Series overview

Episodes

Season 1 (2011)

Season 2 (2012)

References

Kitchen Boss episodes
Kitchen Boss
Kitchen Boss